Xyrichtys blanchardi, the marmalade razorfish, is a species of marine ray-finned fish from the family Labridae, the wrasses. It is found in the Southeast Atlantic Ocean.  

Etymology
The fish is named in honor of H. Blanchard, captain of the research vessel Reine-Pokou from which the type specimen was collected.

References

blanchardi
Taxa named by Achille Valenciennes
Fish described in 1963
Fish of the Atlantic Ocean